This is a list of shipwrecks located in the main body of the Atlantic Ocean, rather than in one of its marginal seas.

References

Mid-Atlantic Ocean
Mid-Atlantic
Shipwrecks in the Mid-Atlantic Ocean, List of